Actinochaetopteryx argentifera is a species of parasitic fly in the family Tachinidae.

Distribution
Papua New Guinea.

References

Diptera of Australasia
Dexiinae
Insects described in 1988
Insects of Papua New Guinea